Baby Jake is a British children's television programme originally broadcast in the UK. It first aired on 4 July 2011. Baby Jake is also available on BBC iPlayer for over a year, and YouTube.

The programme features Jake, a nine-month-old baby. Jake is the youngest of ten children all living in a windmill with their parents, all with their first names starting with the first ten letters of the alphabet.

Each episode features Jake embarking on an adventure with a host of magical characters that may include Pengy Quinn the Penguin, Toot Toot the Tractor, Captain Spacey and the Hamsternauts, Nibbles the Rabbit and Sydney the Monkey. These characters are always doing something related to the adventure that Baby Jake is on.

The show features a child narrator and all ten children are depicted in real life, although Baby Jake is given a multi-angle photographic face on an animated body. Jake's babbling is translated by his 5-year-old brother Isaac. Isaac was voiced by a real-life 5-year-old boy, in a move described by the Guardian as "a risk" since the majority of successful children's television is narrated by adults. The roles of Jake and Isaac are portrayed by real-life brothers Adamo and Franco Bertacchi-Morroni respectively, with Kaizer Akhtar providing the voice of Isaac.

Production 
The programme cost £1.85m to produce, and was funded by the Irish Film Board and CBeebies.

Darrall Macqueen originated the series and produced the animated elements of the programme through JAM Media. JAM Media are an Irish animation studio who also made Tilly and Friends. Maddy Darrall was quoted by the Metro as gaining inspiration for the show from watching her 7-year-old nephew understanding her 1-year-old son.

The series is animated by Jam Media in Dublin and the lead writer is Dave Ingham (Charlie and Lola, Koala Brothers).

Location
The windmill featured in the series is Sibsey Trader Mill just outside the village of Sibsey near Boston in Lincolnshire. In the programme, it is shown as a large family home with additional floors, rooms and windows rather than a working mill, although it shows full working sails. Wheat harvesting in fields in and around the mill at the time had to be delayed to allow filming to take place back in the late summer of 2010 so that they had the correct ripened wheat colours.

Series

Series one of Baby Jake ran in the UK each weekday from July to August 2011 and consisted of 26 episodes in total.

Series two began on 10 September 2012 also consisting of 26 episodes.

Series two was the last series commissioned.  There has been no request for a further series since. The series has also been shown on Al-Jazeera.

Reception

The show was relatively popular at launch compared to other BBC Children's TV programs, occupying all top five positions on the BBC CBeebies iPlayer for a week. In 2013 the show received a UK Broadcast Award.

Episodes

Series 1 (2011)

Series 2 (2012)

References

External links
 

2011 British television series debuts
2012 British television series endings
2010s British children's television series
2010s preschool education television series
BBC children's television shows
British preschool education television series
BBC high definition shows
English-language television shows
CBeebies
Television series about children